Distancing may refer to:

 Distancing, a martial arts term describing the proper placement of one's self with respect to an opponent.
 Distancing (psychology), a technique used in psychological therapy and special education to encourage the early stages of cognition, particularly identity and the separation of one's self from other objects.
 Distancing effect, a technique used in theatre and film